Lemyra diluta is a moth of the family Erebidae. It was described by Thomas in 1990. It is found in China (Fujian, Sichuan, Yunnan, Hunan, Hubei).

References

 

diluta
Moths described in 1990